Michelangelo Ricciolino (1654–1715)  was an Italian painter of the Baroque period.

He was born at Rome, and is noticed by Abate Titi, including paintings he made for the church of S. Lorenzo in Piscibus, and a ceiling in Santa Maria in Campitelli. His self-portrait is in the Florentine Gallery (Uffizi). He died at Rome.

References

1654 births
17th-century Italian painters
Italian male painters
18th-century Italian painters
Italian Baroque painters
1715 deaths
18th-century Italian male artists